This list of museums in Los Angeles is a list of museums located within the City of Los Angeles, defined for this context as institutions (including nonprofit organizations, government entities, and private businesses) that collect and care for objects of cultural, artistic, scientific, or historical interest and make their collections or related exhibits available for public viewing. Also included are non-profit and university art galleries. Museums that exist only in cyberspace (i.e., virtual museums) are not included.

To use the sortable tables: click on the icons at the top of each column to sort that column in alphabetical order; click again for reverse alphabetical order.

Museums

Defunct museums
 Animal Museum, closed May 2017
ARCO Center for Visual Art, closed in 1984
Children's Museum of Los Angeles, closed in 2000
Hollywood Erotic Museum, closed in 2006
Marciano Art Foundation, closed November 2019
 Sports Museum of Los Angeles, closed in 2016
 VIVA Art Center – Valley Institute of Visual Art, Sherman Oaks, closed in 2011
 Wells Fargo History Museum (Los Angeles), closed in 2020

References

External links

Museums in the USA: California
Southern California Museums & Historical Sites
California Association of Museums
California Historical Societies and Museums
LA Tourist: Museums
House Museums, Open Air Museums and Ship Museums in Southern California
Things to do in Los Angeles
Catalina Island Museum

 01
Museums

Lists of museums in the United States by city
Lists of museums in California